The 2012–13 Melbourne Heart FC season was the club's third since its establishment in 2009. The club participated in the A-League for the third time.

Players

Squad

Transfers in

Transfers out

Statistics

Squad statistics

Goal scorers

Competitions

Pre-season

A-League

League table

Results summary

Results by round

Matches

References

External links
 Official website

2012-13
2012–13 A-League season by team